Stig Karl Olof Sjölin (21 December 1928 – 9 January 1995) was a Swedish middleweight boxer. He competed at the 1952 and 1956 Olympics and finished in third and ninth place, respectively. Between 1949 and 1955 he won four medals at European championships.

References

1928 births
1995 deaths
People from Värnamo Municipality
Olympic boxers of Sweden
Olympic bronze medalists for Sweden
Boxers at the 1952 Summer Olympics
Boxers at the 1956 Summer Olympics
Olympic medalists in boxing
Swedish male boxers
Medalists at the 1952 Summer Olympics
Middleweight boxers
Sportspeople from Jönköping County